Modrzejewo may refer to the following places:
Modrzejewo, Gmina Lipnica in Pomeranian Voivodeship (north Poland)
Modrzejewo, Gmina Tuchomie in Pomeranian Voivodeship (north Poland)
Modrzejewo, Chojnice County in Pomeranian Voivodeship (north Poland)